BF may refer to:

People
 Best friend, in internet slang
 Boyfriend, a male romantic or sexual partner
 Bayani Fernando (born 1946), Filipino politician

Places 
 BF Homes Parañaque, a subdivision in the Philippines
 Bahamas (obsolete NATO country code BF)
 Baitul Futuh, a mosque in London
 Beaver Falls, Pennsylvania, a city in western Pennsylvania
 Bonners Ferry, Idaho, a town in Idaho, United States
 Burkina Faso (ISO 3166-1 alpha-2 country code BF)
 .bf, the ccTLD for Burkina Faso

Businesses and organizations 
 B&F System, Inc., a wholesale company
 Bibliotekarforbundet, the Danish Union of Librarians
 Bluebird Cargo (IATA airline designator BF)
 Border Force, a law-enforcement structure in the United Kingdom.
 British Fascists, a fascist organisation from the 1920s

Science and technology 
 BF (protein), an initialism for B factor, a triggering protein of the alternative pathway of complement activation
 Bellman–Ford algorithm, a graph and tree search algorithm
 Blast furnace, a type of metallurgical furnace
 Board foot, a unit of measure of lumber
 Big Falcon Rocket, precursor of SpaceX Starship
 Boron monofluoride (BF), a chemical compound
 Brainfuck, a programming language

Other uses 
 Batters faced, a baseball statistic
 BattleForge, a real-time strategy game produced by Electronic Arts
 Battlefront, a contested armed frontier between opposing forces
 Bigfoot, a mythological ape-like creature
 Bongo Frontier, a pickup truck built by Kia Motors
 Breastfeeding
 Blue film, or Pornographic film

See also 

 
 Black Flag (disambiguation)
 FB (disambiguation)